Isaac Joslin Cox, Ph.D. (1873–1956) was an American professor of history.

He was born at West Creek, Ocean Co., N. J. He graduated from Dartmouth College and for several years did research in Mexico.  He then pursued postgraduate studies at the universities of Texas, Chicago, Wisconsin, and Pennsylvania.

Between 1896 and 1906, Cox was employed at the San Antonio Academy as instructor and vice-principal, and instructor in history at the University of Cincinnati, where he was afterward assistant professor. In 1911-12, he delivered the Albert Shaw Lectures on Diplomatic History at Johns Hopkins University, and in 1919 became professor of history at Northwestern University.  He was president of the Ohio Valley Historical Association.

Works
 The Journeys of La Salle and his Companions (two volumes, 1905)  
 The Early Exploration of Louisiana (1906)  
 The Indian as a Diplomatic Factor in the History of the Old Northwest (1910)
 West Florida Controversy, 1798-1813; A Study In American Diplomacy. (1918)
 Nicaragua and the United States, 1909-1927  (1927)

Notes

References

 
 
  — author information, in the alphabetical list of contributors printed at the end of Volume 29.

1873 births
1956 deaths
American historians
Dartmouth College alumni
University of Cincinnati faculty
Northwestern University faculty
American expatriates in Mexico
University of Texas at Austin alumni
University of Chicago alumni
University of Pennsylvania alumni
University of Wisconsin–Madison alumni